Conorbiinae  was a subfamily of small to quite large sea snails, marine gastropod mollusks in the family Conidae.

This subfamily has also been written by several authors as "Conorbinae". ( and was a long time considered a subfamily of the Turridae.

Bouchet, Kantor et al. elevated in 2011 the subfamily Conorbiinae to the rank of family Conorbidae. This was based on anatomical characters (radular tooth and shell characters) and a dataset of molecular sequences  of three gene fragments

Genera
Genera in the subfamily Conorbiinae include :
Benthofascis  Iredale, 1936 
Conorbis Swainson, 1840

References

Conidae